The simple station Nariño is part of the TransMilenio mass-transit system of Bogotá, Colombia, opened in the year 2001.

Location
The station is located in southern Bogotá, specifically on Avenida Caracas, with Calles 10 and 11 sur.

It serves the neighborhoods of Ciudad Berna and Luna Park.

History
At the beginning of 2001, the second phase of the Caracas line of the system was opened from Tercer Milenio to the intermediate station Calle 40 Sur. A few months later, service was extended south to Portal de Usme.

The station is named Nariño for the ward of the same name in which it is located.

Station services

Old trunk services

Current Trunk Services

Feeder routes
This station does not have connections to feeder routes.

Inter-city service
This station does not have inter-city service.

See also
Bogotá
TransMilenio
List of TransMilenio Stations

External links

Official web site of TransMilenio 

TransMilenio
2001 establishments in Colombia